The Monument "Regulator Maria" Matveev Kurgan is a Russian monument, located near Matveev Kurgan.

History 
Matveev-Kurgan district is rich in monuments to soldiers who defended the (Soviet) Motherland. The Mius Front was there during the Great Patriotic War (1941-1943). Its significance is equal to the Battle of Stalingrad. The fighting continued day and night.

At the road fork of Rostov-Donetsk and Matveev Kurgan, a massive movement of military vehicles occurred, regulated by a young girl named Maria. The legend about the girl is preserved in the memory of her countrymen: "The monument to the Regulator" "is dedicated to the regulators of the 28th Army of Lieutenant-General Gerasimenko who took an active part in the battles for the liberation of this area in 1943.  The monument was erected on the place where the young girl (according to local residents, no one knew the girl) stood for two days. She became tired and hungry, but did not leave her post until she lost consciousness from exhaustion and overwork.

Monument 
The figure of a slender girl in a tunic, two and a half meters high, is set on a concrete foundation whose height reaches one and a half meters.  The gesture of the girl means - "I can move…" Only two such monuments are found in the world. (The second one is installed in Germany.)  The monument opened on May 9, 1973 and was sculpted by Perfilov V.I. The base of the monument is made of brick to a height of 1.5 m on which stands a sculpture with a height of 2.5 m."

Sources 
 "Monuments of military glory of Matveevo-Kurgan district" brief tourist information on the tourist route; L.A.Esina; 2016

External links 
 Matveev Kurgan regional studies museum (in Russian)
 Matveev Kurgan authority (in Russian)

Tourist attractions in Rostov Oblast
Monuments and memorials in Rostov Oblast
World War II memorials in Russia